The Object of Beauty is a 1991 comedy crime–drama film directed by Michael Lindsay-Hogg and starring John Malkovich and Andie MacDowell.

Plot
Jake and Tina have taken up residence in a London hotel, living way beyond their means. He is a commodities broker whose shipment of cocoa beans is tied up by a Third World country's revolution. She is a woman with extravagant tastes who is still technically married to Larry, her first husband.

The two of them are so broke that when it comes time to pay for a dinner at the hotel, Jake hands a credit card to the waiter and prays that it won't be canceled. A pair of hotel executives, Mercer and Swayle, repeatedly make attempts to confront Jake and Tina about their growing unpaid bill.

Only one object stands between the couple and total insolvency. That is a tiny sculpture by Henry Moore that was given to Tina by her husband as a gift. But just as she and Jake hatch a scheme to pretend the object is stolen and collect the insurance on it, a deaf housekeeper, Jenny, decides to steal it for herself.

After she steals it Tina and Jake get upset. Then Jenny's brother decides to take it and sell it, but nobody will buy it and he ends up losing it. Jake and Tina argues, he goes to Joan (Tina's best friend) and they end up sleeping together. Next day Jenny searches with her brother and find the statue in a heap of rubble. Jenny returns it then steals it again and when the insurance company comes she hands it over. Jake and Tina auction it off later and are able to resolve their debt with the hotel and continue to go on vacation.

Cast
 John Malkovich as Jake Bartholemew
 Andie MacDowell as Tina Lesley Bartholemew
 Lolita Davidovich as Joan
 Rudi Davies as Jenny
 Joss Ackland as Mr. Mercer
 Bill Paterson as Victor Swayle
 Ricci Harnett as Steve
 Peter Riegert as Lawrence ″Larry″ Oates
 Jack Shepherd as Mr. Slaughter
 Rosemary Martin as Mrs. Doughty
 Roger Lloyd-Pack as Frankie
 Andrew Hawkins as Gordon
 Pip Torrens as Art evaluator
 Stephen Churchett as Mr. Mundy
 Annie Hayes as Housekeeper
 Richard Ireson as Night porter
 Barry J. Gordon as Auctioneer
 Jeremy Sinden as Jonathan
 Ginger Corbett as Melissa
 John Crocker as Waiter
 Victoria Willing as Portuguese maid #1
 Lara De Almeida as Portuguese maid #2
 Liz Daniels as Portuguese maid #3
 Andy Cavenash as Steve's friend
 Wayne Bailey as Steve's friend
 Colin Parker as Steve's friend
 Stewart Miller as Steve's friend
 Brian Coyle as Steve's friend
 Dillon O'Mahoney as Steve's friend
 Massimo Burlini as Enrico
 Mario Nocerino as Italian father

Reception
On Rotten Tomatoes the film has an approval rating of 77% based on reviews from 13 critics.

Roger Ebert of the Chicago Sun-Times gave the film 3.5 out of a possible 4 stars. He wrote: "By the end of the film, the plot has been worked out to everyone's satisfaction, but the plot isn't really that important. What is important is the ways that people love one another."

TV Guide wrote- "The Object of Beauty is not a joy forever. To watch Andie MacDowell and John Malkovich flounder in roles that might once have gone to Cary Grant and Irene Dunne or William Powell and Myrna Loy is to experience moviegoing misery.

References

External links
 

1991 films
1990s crime comedy-drama films
1990s English-language films
Films shot in Sardinia
Films directed by Michael Lindsay-Hogg
British crime comedy-drama films
American crime comedy-drama films
1990s American films
1990s British films